70 St Mary Axe, informally known as the Can of Ham due to its shape, is an office building in the City of London. It was completed in early 2019. During its construction, the City of London Corporation decided to pedestrianise the part of St Mary Axe along which the building sits, between Bevis Marks to the south-west and Houndsditch to the north-east.

Development 

The architectural design was created by Foggo Associates for Targetfollow, and planning permission was granted in 2008. Targetfollow sold the site to Nuveen in 2011 for £20m but development was delayed during the global financial crisis.

The sole tenant of 60 St Mary Axe agreed in 2014 to exit their lease early, and in 2015 Mace Group Ltd was appointed to build the project. Construction began that same year, and involved 400 workers, 90% of whom were employed through subcontractors.

During development, the project was criticised by some for its shape and its size.

Construction completed in Spring 2019, but the building did not open until later in the year.

In popular culture

Television 

The building was used as the location for the interview stage in the 2019 and 2022 series of The Apprentice.

Theatre 
The address, 70 St Mary Axe, was the location of the title character's offices in Gilbert and Sullivan's 1877 operetta The Sorcerer.

Literature 
The address, 70 St Mary Axe, is a recurring location in the novels of Tom Holt, basing the use of the address on its previous use in Gilbert and Sullivan's The Sorcerer.

References 

Office buildings completed in 2019
Office buildings in London
2019 establishments in England